The Calverton School is a college preparatory, private, day and boarding school located in Huntingtown, Maryland, approximately 45 minutes east of Washington, D.C. and 30 minutes south of Annapolis, Maryland.

They currently enroll 325 students beginning in Preschool through Grade 12. Day students come from five counties, including Calvert, Charles, St. Mary's, Anne Arundel, and Prince George's. Bus transportation stops in each of the five counties provided. The school includes the main building in which Upper (High) and Middle school are located, a recently built complex for the Lower School, a main office, which is the original building, a gym, and a sports complex that is currently being built. Calverton's Extended Day Program offers an extension of the school day. In September 2014, the school opened its One World Residential Village, allowing the school to expand its high school boarding program. In September 2015, the school and its residential village became host to the D.C. United Academy Residency Program for elite young soccer players  from around the world.

Accreditation
The Calverton School is accredited by the following associations:
National Association of Independent Schools
Association of Independent Maryland Schools
Maryland State Department of Education

References

Private elementary schools in Maryland
Private middle schools in Maryland
Private high schools in Maryland
Schools in Calvert County, Maryland
Educational institutions established in 1967
1967 establishments in Maryland